(born February 23, 1956) is a Japanese singer and tarento. He is the father of two actor sons.

Filmography

Films
Fly Me to the Saitama (2019)
The Memory Eraser (2020)
Tonkatsu DJ Agetarō (2020)

Television
 Kamen Rider Ex-Aid (2017), Johnny Maxima

External links
Brother Tom's profile at Stardust Promotion
Tom-san no Kaisya
Kim Sound Story
Pocky R☆NKING Paradise

1956 births
Japanese lyricists
Japanese male singers
Living people
Japanese male musicians
Japanese people of American descent
Stardust Promotion artists
Singers from Hawaii
Japanese male actors